Tae-won is a Korean masculine given name. The meaning of the name differs based on the hanja used to write each syllable. There are 20 hanja with the reading "tae" and 35 hanja with the reading "won" on the South Korean government's official list of hanja which may be used in given names.

People with this name include:
Chey Tae-won (born 1960), South Korean businessman, chairman of SK Group
Kim Tae-won (born 1965), South Korean guitarist
Lee Tae-Won (born 1986), South Korean baseball player
Noh Tae-won (born 1957), South Korean physicist
Park Tae-Won (born 1977), South Korean football player

See also
List of Korean given names

References

Korean masculine given names